Agudotherium is an extinct genus of prozostrodontian cynodonts from the Late Triassic Candelária Formation of the Paraná Basin in southern Brazil. The genus contains one species, Agudotherium gassenae. A. gassenae is known from two specimens, both consisting of partial lower jaws with teeth.

Etymology 
The generic name Agudotherium comes from the municipality of Agudo, Rio Grande do Sul, where the fossils were discovered, and the Greek word , meaning "beast".

References 

Prehistoric prozostrodonts
Prehistoric cynodont genera
Norian genera
Late Triassic synapsids of South America
Triassic Brazil
Fossils of Brazil
Paraná Basin
Fossil taxa described in 2020